Paradise: Faith is a 2012 Austrian drama film directed by Ulrich Seidl, the second in his Paradise trilogy. The film was nominated for the Golden Lion at the 69th Venice International Film Festival and won the Special Jury Prize. It won the award for best sound design at the 26th European Film Awards.

The film has been named as a favourite of director John Waters, who presented the film as his annual pick within the 2013 Maryland Film Festival.

Plot
Anna Maria (Maria Hofstätter) is a middle-aged Austrian woman who lives alone in a well-knitted house in Vienna. When she doesn't work in the hospital, she cleans her house thoroughly. But she doesn't feel alone; she has Jesus; she loves Jesus. This unconditional love of God empowers her to overcome the temptations of her flesh, by praying and by methodically using all sorts of self-punishments.

But she is not alone in her quest; she is a member of a small ultra-religious group which tries to bring the Catholic faith back to Austria; when she takes a break from her work instead of going on vacations, she tries door to door to bring God to poor neighborhoods which are occupied mostly by immigrants.

Although her faith is strong, it will be challenged not only by the various reactions of the people that she tries to approach, but also back home, where her past vividly returns. Her crippled Muslim husband returns and demands a share of her love, which she offers gladly only to Jesus.

Cast
 Maria Hofstätter as Anna Maria
 Nabil Saleh as Nabil
 Natalya Baranova as Natalya
 Rene Rupnik as Herr Rupnik

References

External links
 
 Paradise: Faith at the Austrian Film Institute

2012 films
2012 drama films
Austrian drama films
Films about marriage
Films about Catholicism
Films directed by Ulrich Seidl
2010s German-language films
Venice Grand Jury Prize winners